Ulocladium atrum is a fungal saprophyte.

U. atrum is used to control Botrytis cinerea, a fungal pathogen (gray mold) of grapes and other fruit.

The species has also been found as a cause of keratitis, inflammation of the cornea.

References

External links 
 Index Fungorum
 USDA ARS Fungal Database

Fungal pest control agents
Pleosporaceae